The Encyclopedia of Indo-European Culture (EIEC) is an encyclopedia of Indo-European studies and the Proto-Indo-Europeans. The encyclopedia was edited by J. P. Mallory and Douglas Q. Adams and published in 1997 by Fitzroy Dearborn. Archaeological articles are written by Mallory, linguistic articles are written by Adams, and includes a distinguished Who's Who of 1990s Indo-Europeanists who made contributions as sub-editors. Though it is not a polemic, the work in part extends support to Colin Renfrew's Anatolian hypothesis of Indo-European origins.

Bibliography 
 

Indo-European studies
Encyclopedias of culture and ethnicity
Archaeology books